{{DISPLAYTITLE:Pi1 Cygni}}

Pi1 Cygni (π1 Cygni, abbreviated Pi1 Cyg, π1 Cyg) is a binary star in the northern constellation of Cygnus. It is visible to the naked eye, having a combined apparent visual magnitude of 4.66. The distance to this system can be roughly gauged by its annual parallax shift of 1.89 mas, which yields a separation of around 1,700 light years from the Sun, give or take a hundred light years.

The two components are designated Pi1 Cygni A (officially named Azelfafage , the traditional name for the system) and B.

Nomenclature

π1 Cygni (Latinised to Pi1 Cygni) is the star's Bayer designation. The designations of the two components as Pi1 Cygni A and B derive from the convention used by the Washington Multiplicity Catalog (WMC) for multiple star systems, and adopted by the International Astronomical Union (IAU).

It bore the traditional name Azelfafage, derived from the Arabic ظلف الفرس Dhilf al-faras meaning "the horse track" or (probably) ذيل الدجاجة Dhail al-dajājah meaning "the tail of hen". In 2016, the IAU organized a Working Group on Star Names (WGSN) to catalogue and standardize proper names for stars. The WGSN approved the name Azelfafage for Pi1 Cygni on 12 September 2016 and it is now so included in the List of IAU-approved Star Names. For such names relating to members of multiple star systems, and where a component letter is not explicitly listed, the WGSN says that the name should be understood to be attributed to the brightest component by visual brightness - in this case Pi1 Cygni A.

Consequently, the Chinese name for Pi1 Cygni itself is 

Properties 

This is a single-lined spectroscopic binary with a close, circular orbit, having a period of just 26.33 days. The primary, component A, is a slightly evolved B-type subgiant star with a stellar classification of B3 IV. It has an estimated 10 times the mass of the Sun and around 5.6 times the Sun's radius. The star radiates 16,538 times the solar luminosity from its outer atmosphere at an effective temperature of roughly 18,360 K. It is about 25 million years old and is spinning with a projected rotational velocity of 55 km/s.

References

B-type subgiants
Spectroscopic binaries
Cygnus (constellation)
Cygni, Pi1
Azelfafage
BD+34 3798
Cygni, 80
206672
107136
8301